Chloropicrin, also known as PS and nitrochloroform, is a chemical compound currently used as a broad-spectrum antimicrobial, fungicide, herbicide, insecticide, and nematicide. It was used as a poison gas in World War I. Its chemical structural formula is Cl3CNO2.

Synthesis
Chloropicrin was discovered in 1848 by Scottish chemist John Stenhouse. He prepared it by the reaction of sodium hypochlorite with picric acid:
 HOC6H2(NO2)3 + 11 NaOCl → 3 Cl3CNO2 + 3 Na2CO3 + 3 NaOH + 2 NaCl
Because of the precursor used, Stenhouse named the compound chloropicrin, although the two compounds are structurally dissimilar.

Today, chloropicrin is manufactured by the reaction of nitromethane with sodium hypochlorite:
 H3CNO2 + 3 NaOCl → Cl3CNO2 + 3 NaOH
or by the reaction of chloroform with nitric acid:
 CHCl3 + HNO3 → CCl3NO2 + H2O

Properties
Chloropicrin's chemical formula is CCl3NO2 and its molecular weight is 164.38 grams/mole. Pure chloropicrin is a colorless liquid, with a boiling point of 112 °C. Chloropicrin is sparingly soluble in water with solubility of 2 g/L at 25 °C. It is volatile, with a vapor pressure of 23.2 millimeters of mercury (mmHg) at 25 °C; the corresponding Henry's law constant is 0.00251 atmosphere-cubic meter per mole. The octanol-water partition coefficient (Kow) of chloropicrin is estimated to be 269. Its soil adsorption coefficient (Koc; normalized to soil organic matter content) is 25 cm3/g.

Use
Chloropicrin was manufactured for use as poison gas in World War I. In agriculture, chloropicrin is injected into soil prior to planting a crop to fumigate soil. Chloropicrin affects a broad spectrum of fungi, microbes, and insects. It is commonly used as a stand-alone treatment or in combination / co-formulation with methyl bromide and 1,3-dichloropropene.
Chloropicrin is used as an indicator and repellent when fumigating residences for insects with sulfuryl fluoride which is an odorless gas. Chloropicrin's mode of action is unknown (IRAC MoA 8B). Chloropicrin may stimulate weed germination, which can be useful when quickly followed by a more effective herbicide.

Safety
At the national level, chloropicrin is regulated by the United States Environmental Protection Agency as a restricted use pesticide. Because of its toxicity and carcinogenicity, distribution and use of chloropicrin is available only to licensed professionals and specially certified growers who are trained in its proper and safe use. In the US, occupational exposure limits have been set at 0.1 ppm over an eight-hour time-weighted average.

Agriculture
In 2008 the US EPA re-approved chloropicrin as safe for use in agricultural settings, stating that treatments "can provide benefits to both food consumers and growers. For consumers, it means more fresh fruits and vegetables can be cheaply produced domestically year-round because several severe pest problems can be efficiently controlled." To ensure chloropicrin is used safely, the EPA requires a strict set of protections for handlers, workers, and persons living and working in and around farmland during treatments. EPA protections were increased in both 2011 and 2012, reducing fumigant exposures and significantly improving safety. Protections include the training of certified applicators supervising pesticide application, the use of buffer zones, posting before and during pesticide application, fumigant management plans, and compliance assistance and assurance measures.

Used as a preplant soil treatment measure, chloropicrin suppresses soilborne pathogenic fungi and some nematodes and insects. According to chloropicrin manufacturers, with a half-life of hours to days, it is completely digested by soil organisms before the crop is planted, making it safe and efficient. Contrary to popular belief, chloropicrin does not sterilize soil and does not deplete the ozone layer, as the compound is destroyed by sunlight. Additionally, chloropicrin has never been found in groundwater, due to its low solubility.

California
In California experience with acute effects of chloropicrin when used as a soil fumigant for strawberries and other crops led to the release of regulations in January 2015 creating buffer zones and other precautions to minimize exposure of farm workers, neighbors, and passersby.

High сoncentrations

Chloropicrin is harmful to humans. It can be absorbed systemically through inhalation, ingestion, and the skin. At high concentrations it is severely irritating to the lungs, eyes, and skin. In World War I, German forces used concentrated chloropicrin against Allied forces as a tear gas. While not as lethal as other chemical weapons, it induced vomiting and forced Allied soldiers to remove their masks to vomit, exposing them to more toxic gases used as weapons during the war.

Damage to protective gear
Chloropicrin and its derivative phosgene oxime have been known to damage or compromise earlier generations of personal protective equipment. Allied forces were exposed to chloropicrin on the Italian front during WWII. Some of the soldiers attacked mentioned a white smoke emerging from their gas masks.

See also
Trichloronitrosomethane
Tetrachlorodinitroethane

References

World War I chemical weapons
Fumigants
Pulmonary agents
Lachrymatory agents
Vomiting agents
Nitro compounds
Trichloromethyl compounds
Fungicides
Herbicides
Insecticides
Nematicides